FIM may refer to:

Organizations and companies
 Fédération Internationale de Motocyclisme, the International Motorcycling Federation
 Flint Institute of Music, in Michigan, United States
 Fox Interactive Media, now News Corp. Digital Media
 Institute for Mathematical Research, at ETH Zurich
 Independent Moralizing Front, a defunct Peruvian political party
 International Federation of Musicians, a global union federation

Science and technology
 Facing Identification Mark, a bar code designed by the United States Postal Service
 Field ion microscope, used to image the arrangement of atoms 
 File integrity monitoring, used to validate software files
 Fim switch, in E. coli
 Flow-following, finite-volume Icosahedral Model, a numerical weather prediction model 
 Focused impedance measurement
 Forefront Identity Manager, identity management software

Other
 Finnish markka, the former currency of Finland
 First-in-man study, in medical clinical trials
 Fisher information matrix, in mathematical statistics
 Flight interruption manifest, a substitute airline ticket
 Functional Independence Measure, tool for assessing functional capacities of patients undergoing rehabilitation
Friendship Is Magic aka My Little Pony: Friendship Is Magic, a 2010 animated series